The 2020 Southland Conference women's basketball tournament, a part of the 2019–20 NCAA Division I women's basketball season, was scheduled to take place March 12–15, 2020 at the Merrell Center in Katy, Texas. The tournament was cancelled on March 12 just before the first game.  The winner of the tournament would have received the Southland Conference's automatic bid to the 2020 NCAA tournament.

Seeds and regular season standings
Only the top 8 teams qualified for the Southland Conference tournament. This chart shows all the teams records and standings and explains why teams advanced to the conference tourney or finished in certain tiebreaking positions.

Schedule
Tournament cancelled

Bracket
Tournament cancelled

See also
2020 Southland Conference men's basketball tournament
Southland Conference women's basketball tournament

References

External links
 2020 Southland Conference Basketball Tournament

Southland Conference women's basketball tournament
2019–20 Southland Conference women's basketball season
Southland Conference women's basketball tournament
Southland Conference Women's basketball